Attorney General Rice may refer to:

Milton P. Rice (1920–2018), Attorney General of Tennessee
Samuel Allen Rice (1828–1864), Attorney General of Iowa

See also
General Rice (disambiguation)